Wassef Habib El Harake (or Wassef Harake, Arabic واصف حبيب الحركة) is a Lebanese lawyer, political activist and a candidate for the Shiite seat in the third Mount Lebanon district for the Baadba for Change list. He is one of the Lebanese Revolution's most prominent faces, capable of mobilizing hundreds of people by his mere presence. He presents himself as a political alternative to the ruling class, thus he was physically attacked on multiple occasions, by his opponents and authorities' police.

Biography 
He was born on 4/12/1971, holding a law degree from Beirut Arab University.

He started his political activism since the 1990s.

He became one of the most dominant faces since the start of the 17 October 2019 Revolution in Lebanon.

On December 6, 2019, he filed a complaint, with a group of lawyers, to the Public Prosecutor Ghassan Oweidat, against all public servants (ministers, public employees, mayors, contractors, etc.) whose negligence and violation of laws cause the floods all over Lebanon on December 4–5, 2019.

In 2020, politicians Wael Abu Faour sued Wassef El Harakeh, after he latter accused Abou Faour of smuggling cancer medicine to As-Suwayda, Syria during his tenure as Minister of Public Health, which caused shortage in the medicaments for the Lebanese citizens.

Activities 

 He is a member of the Popular Observatory for Fighting Corruption (المرصد الشعبي لمحاربة الفساد) 
 He is one of the founders of the We Want Accountability (بدنا نحاسب ) campaign

He has coordination relationships with many associations concerned with politics and social activity, such as:

 Sabaa Party حزب سبعة
You Stink Movement طلعت ريحتكم
Citizens of a State مواطنون ومواطنات في دولة
 The Upper Matn Movement حراك المتن الأعلى
 The Gathering of Sons of Baalbek  تجمع أبناء بعلبك
 The Meeting of the Civil State لقاء الدولة المدنية
 Right صح
 My Right حقّي
 United متحدون,
To My Country لبلدي
 The Encounter of Identity and Sovereignty لقاء الهوية والسيادة

See also 

 Lokman Slim
 Mona Fayad
 Paula Yacoubian

References 

Lebanese politicians
Beirut Arab University alumni
Lebanese activists
1971 births
Living people